Clostridium aminophilum is a species of gram-positive ammonia-producing ruminal bacteria, with type strain FT.

References

Further reading

Krause, Denis O., and James B. Russell. "An rRNA approach for assessing the role of obligate amino acid-fermenting bacteria in ruminal amino acid deamination." Applied and Environmental Microbiology 62.3 (1996): 815–821.

External links
LPSN

Type strain of Clostridium aminophilum at BacDive -  the Bacterial Diversity Metadatabase

Bacteria described in 1993
aminophilum